Jindra may refer to:
 3515 Jindra, a main-belt asteroid named after Lumír Jindra (b. 1936)

People

Last name 
 Alfréd Jindra (1930–2006), a Czechoslovak sprint canoer
 Aleš Jindra (born 1973), a Czechoslovak football coach and former player
 Jan Jindra (born 1932), a Czech rower
 Josef Jindra (born 1980), a Czech professional ice hockey player
 Otto Jindra (1896–1932), an Austro-Hungarian flying ace during World War I

First name 
 Jindra Dolanský (born 1964), a Czech musician
 Jindra Holá (born 1960), a Czech ice dancer
 Jindra Košťálová, an artistic gymnast from Czechoslovakia
 Jindra Kramperová (born 1940), a Czech figure skater and pianist
 Jindra Tichá (born 1937), a Czech-born academic and writer